Geoffrey Mudge (fl. 1414–1427), of Guildford, Surrey, was an English politician.

Family
His wife was named Joan; nothing more is recorded of his family.

Career
He was a Member (MP) of the Parliament of England for Guildford in November 1414. He was Mayor of Guildford from 1426 to 1427.

References

14th-century births
15th-century deaths
English MPs November 1414
Members of Parliament for Guildford
Mayors of places in Surrey